Kifri District is one of the six districts of Diyala Governorate in Iraq. Its main town is Kifri. The population was estimated at 42,010 in 2003.

References

Districts of Diyala Province
Geography of Iraqi Kurdistan
Geography of Iraq